Chuang Chu Lin (27 July 1900 – 4 January 1973), also spelled as Zhuang Zhulin, was a pioneer educator in Singapore. He is the founding principal for Chung Cheng High School, and vice-chancellor of Nanyang University, the first Chinese university in Southeast Asia.

Contributions 
Zhuang was among the Chinese community leaders that advocated for the founding of Chung Cheng High School, the second full Chinese middle school after The Chinese High School. As the founding principal, Zhuang backed the post-war expansion of the institution as enrolment increased.

Zhuang was appointed the principal for Nanyang University, also known as "Nantah", when opened in 1955.

References

1900 births
1973 deaths